The Río Tinto (red river or Tinto River) is a river in southwestern Spain that rises in the Sierra Morena mountains of Andalusia. It flows generally south-southwest, reaching the Gulf of Cádiz at Huelva. The Rio Tinto river has a unique red and orange colour derived from its chemical makeup that is extremely acidic and with very high levels of iron and heavy metals.

The river maintains its colour for an approximate length of 50 kilometres. After the 50 kilometre mark, the chemistry that makes the Rio Tinto river so unique appears to slowly decline, as does the odd colouring. The location where the chemistry of the river is altered is near a town called Niebla. The river's chemistry begins to significantly change following the town of Niebla owing to the fact that the Rio Tinto blends itself with other streams that are connected to the Atlantic Ocean. This area has large amounts of ore and sulfide deposits.

The Rio Tinto area has been the source of approximately 5,000 years of ore mining, including copper, silver, gold, and other minerals, extracted as far as 20 kilometres from the river shores. As a possible result of the mining, the Río Tinto is notable for being very acidic (pH 2) and its deep reddish hue is due to iron dissolved in the water. Acid mine drainage from the mines leads to severe environmental problems because the acidity (low pH) dissolves heavy metals into the water. It is not clear how much acid drainage has come from natural processes and how much has come from mining. There are severe environmental concerns over the pollution in the river.

Although the river represents a harsh environment for life, some microorganisms classified as extremophiles do thrive in these conditions. Such life forms include certain species of bacteria, algae and heterotrophs.

History

The ore body was deposited during the Carboniferous period (300–350 Ma) by hydrothermal activities on the sea floor. The history of mining in the Rio Tinto area traces back to the Tartessans and the Iberians starting mining in 3000 BC, followed by the Phoenicians, Greeks, Romans, Visigoths, and Moors. The Rio Tinto region has been the source of approximately 5,000 years of ore extraction, and chemical refinement primarily for copper, silver and gold, and later for iron,  manganese and other minerals. This long standing mining activity has vastly modified the topography of the region.

After a period of abandonment and disuse, the mines were rediscovered in 1556 and the Spanish government began operating them once again in 1724. In the 19th century, companies from the United Kingdom started large-scale mining operations. In 1873, the Rio Tinto Company was formed to operate the mines. Production declined after the peak of production in 1930, and it ended in 1986 for copper mining and in 1996 for silver and gold mining. All mining ended in 2001.

Increased copper prices in the 2010s led to efforts by EMED Mining to reopen the mine, but difficulties in acquiring all necessary property rights, environmental concerns, and obtaining regulatory approval delayed reopening. The mine, which employed as many as 20,000 in the past, would employ 350 people during its startup phase. Environmental concerns are centered on long disused water reservoirs which might not be able to withstand the stress of renewed waste inputs.

Controversy on its nature 

Due to the extreme conditions of the river, there is very little in the way of life, with the exception of small amounts of microorganisms, including algae. The presence of anaerobic bacteria in the sediments is thought to contribute somewhat to the river's famously low pH (acidity), that in turn increases the concentration of dissolved heavy metals. The waters from the Rio Tinto, high in metal sulfides, provide an ideal environment for chemolithoautotrophic microorganisms, with the sulfides acting as a food source. The product of metal sulfide metabolism through oxidization is ferric iron and secretion of acidic liquid. The continuation of this process for an extended period of time is thought by some scientists to be responsible for keeping the river's pH between 2 and 2.5 in most areas. Even in the extremely acidic water, both red and green algae have been observed to thrive in relatively high concentrations. Despite algae levels in the Rio Tinto accounting for over half of the total biomass in the river, algae is understood to have minimal effects on the characteristics of the complex ecosystem.

The discovery of multiple oxide terraces mediated by microorganisms at up to 60 meters above the current water level, and as far away as 20 kilometers from the current river's path, may suggest that the unusual ecosystem is a natural phenomenon since before human mining activities started in this region.  On the other hand, it is known that toxic water emanates from these vast underground and open pit mines and chemical ore refinement that had been active off and on for thousands of years. While it is still undetermined if the unique water chemistry of the Rio Tinto developed as a result of thousands of years of mining or by natural causes, it is possible that the river's chemical makeup is due to the combination of both natural causes and acid mine drainage. The river drains an area with huge deposits of sulfides which was formed more than 350 million years ago. When sulfides are exposed to air, water, and microorganisms, drainage from acidic rocks flows into surface and ground water. Mining, however, greatly increases exposed areas.

Astrobiology
This river has gained recent scientific interest due to the presence of extremophile anaerobic bacteria that dwell in the acidic water. The subsurface rocks on the river bed contain iron and sulfide minerals on which the bacteria feed. The extreme conditions in the river may be analogous to other locations in the Solar System thought to contain liquid water, such as groundwater on Mars. Scientists have also directly compared the chemistry of the water in which the Mars rocks of Meridiani Planum were deposited in the past with the Río Tinto. Likewise, the moon Europa contains an acidic ocean of water underneath its ice surface, thus the Rio Tinto river is of interest to astrobiologists studying the environmental limits of life and planetary habitability.

See also
 Acid mine drainage
 Environmental impact of mining
 List of rivers of Spain
 Tourist Mining Train

References

External links

 Mars Analog Research and Technology Experiment FAQ
 Protected Landscape Río Tinto
 Mining Park of Rio Tinto With link to The Ernest Lluch mining Museum, RioTinto, the fairly new mining museum of the area, containing a permanent exhibition on the history of mining, and geological information.

Rivers of Spain
Rivers of Andalusia
Environmental impact of mining
Environmental issues in Spain
Mining in Spain